Playing is a live album by jazz quartet Old and New Dreams. It features trumpeter Don Cherry, saxophonist Dewey Redman, bassist Charlie Haden and drummer Ed Blackwell and was recorded in 1980 for the ECM label.

Reception 
Allmusic awarded the album 3 stars with reviewer Scott Yanow calling it "Recommended, as are Old and New Dreams' other three releases". Reviewer Tyran Grillo called the album a "fantastic set" that is "the place to start for anyone wanting a glimpse into the attic of Old And New Dreams." He wrote: "Considering the heft of talents assembled here, the results are weightlessly executed. This shows not weakness or lack of fortitude, but the maturity everyone brings to the sonic table. This is a solid date from musicians who know the business inside and out, and then some. About as good as it gets." Regarding the album's opener, Ethan Iverson commented: "You could almost call this outstanding performance a jam session. The harmonic matrix between Redman and Haden is thrilling; they’re making up changes and patterns together. Cherry is also in prime form. During each horn solo, Blackwell and Haden go into halftime. In response, Redman gives us pure diatonic melody, while Cherry deals out the blues. The bass solo is fabulous; the collective improvisation after is joyous; Blackwell gets a proper say as well. If I had to choose one Old and New Dreams track, I'd select 'Happy House.'"

Track listing 
 "Happy House" (Ornette Coleman) - 11:07 
 "Mopti" (Don Cherry) - 7:56 
 "New Dream" (Coleman) - 9:04 
 "Rushour" (Dewey Redman) - 7:01 
 "Broken Shadows" (Coleman) - 9:58 
 "Playing" (Charlie Haden) - 9:46

 Recorded at the Cornmarket Theater in Bregenz, Austria in June 1980

Personnel 
Don Cherry - pocket trumpet, piano
Dewey Redman - tenor saxophone, musette
Charlie Haden - bass
Ed Blackwell - drums

References 

ECM Records live albums
Old and New Dreams albums
1980 live albums
Albums produced by Manfred Eicher